Donus is a genus of true weevils in the tribe Hyperini.

References 

 Legalov, A.A. 2011: New species of the genus Donus Jekel, 1865 (Coleoptera: Curculionidae) from Kyrgyzstan and Afghanistan. Caucasian entomological bulletin, 7(2), pages 183–189 (in Russian)

External links 
 

 
 Donus at insectoid.info

Curculionidae genera
Hyperinae